Keerthi Keshav Bhat (born 2 June 1999), is an Indian actress who primarily works in Kannada and Telugu television. She made her acting debut with Ice Mahal in 2017. Bhat is best known for her portrayal of Bhanu in Manasichi Choodu and Dr.Hima Karthik in Karthika Deepam (Telugu TV series).  In 2022, she appeared in Telugu reality show Bigg Boss Telugu 6 as a contestant and emerged as the 2nd runner up.

Early life 
Bhat was born on 2 June 1999 in Banglore, Karnataka, India. In 2017 Keerthi's family members meet an accident. She lost her entire family including (her father, mother, brother, and sister-in-law).

Career
Bhat began her acting career in 2017, she made her first Kannada debut film Ice Mahal. From 2019 to 2022, she portrayed the leading role of Bhanumathi a.k.a. Bhanu in Star Maa's soap opera Manasichi Choodu. In 2021, she participated many Telugu TV Show, 100% Love which aired on the Star Maa's channel, she appeared in Star Maa Parivaar League Season 3. 

In 2022, she was seen portraying Dr.Hima Karthik in Star Maa's Karthika Deepam (Telugu TV series)  opposite Manas Nagulapalli and Manoj Kumar. Since September 2022, she is seen participating in the Star Maa's reality show Bigg Boss (Telugu season 6).

In 2023, she will be seen in Star Maa's upcoming series Madhuranagarilo as Raadha.

Filmography

Films

Television

Special appearances

Music videos

References

External links 
 
 
 

Living people
People from Karnataka
Indian film actresses
Indian television actresses
Indian soap opera actresses
Actresses in Telugu television
Actresses in Kannada cinema
Bigg Boss (Telugu TV series) contestants
21st-century Indian actresses
1999 births